Norman Lee (10 October 1898 – 2 June 1964) was a British screenwriter and film director.

Selected filmography

 The Lure of the Atlantic (1929)
 The Streets of London (1929)
 Night Patrol (1930, documentary)
 Doctor Josser K.C. (1931)
 The Strangler (1932)
 Strip, Strip, Hooray (1932)
 Josser in the Army (1932)
 The Pride of the Force (1933)
 Money Talks (1933)
 Forgotten Men (British film) (c.1934)
 The Outcast (1934)
 Spring in the Air (1934)
 A Political Party (1934)
 Doctor's Orders (1934)
 Royal Cavalcade (1935)
 Mother, Don't Rush Me (1936)
 Happy Days Are Here Again (1936)
 No Escape (1936)
 Saturday Night Revue (1937)
 French Leave (1937)
 Bulldog Drummond at Bay (1937)
 Kathleen Mavourneen (1937)
 Knights for a Day (1937)
 Wanted by Scotland Yard (1937)
 Save a Little Sunshine (1938)
 Mr. Reeder in Room 13 (1938)
 Murder in Soho (1939)
 The Door with Seven Locks (1940)
 The Farmer's Wife (1941)
 This Man Is Mine (1946)
 The Monkey's Paw (1948)
 The Idol of Paris (1948)
 The Case of Charles Peace (1949)

References

External links
 

1898 births
1964 deaths
British film directors
British male screenwriters
People from Surrey
20th-century British screenwriters